Edvard Lasota (born 7 March 1971) is a former Czech football player who played mostly as a midfielder. Spending most of his career in the Czech leagues he had short spells in Italy with AC Reggiana and Salernitana. He also played for the Czech Republic, having 15 caps and 2 goals.

Career statistics

International goals
Scores and results list. Czech Republic's goal tally first.

External links
 
 
 
 

1971 births
Living people
Czech footballers
Czech Republic international footballers
Sportspeople from Třinec
1997 FIFA Confederations Cup players
Czech First League players
Serie B players
Dukla Prague footballers
SK Sigma Olomouc players
SK Slavia Prague players
FC Fastav Zlín players
FC Zbrojovka Brno players
SFC Opava players
A.C. Reggiana 1919 players
U.S. Salernitana 1919 players
FK Drnovice players
Expatriate footballers in Italy
Association football midfielders